Grzegorz Sołogub  DFC (1918-1986) was a Polish fighter ace of the Polish Air Force in World War II with 5 confirmed kills.

Biography
Sołogub was born in Mołodeczno in the family of a former Imperial Russian army officer. In 1938 he entered the Polish Air Force Academy in Dęblin. After the September Campaign he was evacuated to the UK via Romania and France. After training he joined No. 317 Polish Fighter Squadron in April 1941. On 26 May he was transferred to No. 306 Polish Fighter Squadron. Sołogub scored his first victory on 27 September and was commissioned four days later. Having completed a combat tour, from 21 April 1943 he served as instructor at No. 58 OTU and then from October at No. 61 OTU. On 20 October he returned to No. 306 Squadron. From 9 July 1944 to 20 December 1944 he flew in No. 302 Polish Fighter Squadron then he came back to No. 306, where on 5 January 1945 he took command of B Flight.

After demobilisation he acquired a farm at Mitcheldean and became a farmer.

Grzegorz Sołogub died on 25 November 1986.

Aerial victory credits
 Bf 109 – 27 September 1941  
 Bf 109 – 30 December 1941 (probably destroyed)
 2 Bf 109 – 16 April 1942 
 Bf 109 – 7 June 1944 
 Fw 190 – 23 June 1944

Awards
 Virtuti Militari, Silver Cross
 Cross of Valour (Poland), four times
 Distinguished Flying Cross (United Kingdom)

References

Further reading
 Tadeusz Jerzy Krzystek, Anna Krzystek: Polskie Siły Powietrzne w Wielkiej Brytanii w latach 1940-1947 łącznie z Pomocniczą Lotniczą Służbą Kobiet (PLSK-WAAF). Sandomierz: Stratus, 2012, p. 529. 
 Jerzy Pawlak: Absolwenci Szkoły Orląt: 1925-1939. Warszawa: Retro-Art, 2009, p. 280. 
 Piotr Sikora: Asy polskiego lotnictwa. Warszawa: Oficyna Wydawnicza Alma-Press. 2014, p. 372-375. 
 Piotr Sikora, Grzegorz Sołogub – Sześć dni polskiego ASA, Stratus 2012, pages: 120
 Józef Zieliński: Asy polskiego lotnictwa. Warszawa: Agencja lotnicza ALTAIR, 1994, p. 67. ISBN 83862172.

External links
 
 
 

Polish World War II flying aces
Recipients of the Silver Cross of the Virtuti Militari
1986 deaths
1918 births
Recipients of the Distinguished Flying Cross (United Kingdom)
People from Forest of Dean District